The Vilnius Court of Commercial Arbitration (lit. Vilniaus komercinio arbitražo teismas) is a Court of commercial arbitration in Vilnius, Lithuania. 
Vilnius Court of Commercial Arbitration – is an attractive alternative to solve both national and international commercial disputes in a confidential way.

Address:  M.Valančiaus g. 1A-7, 03155 Vilnius, Lithuania.

History 
The Court was established as a result of the reorganization of the two arbitration institutions. At the end of October 2003, the two main Lithuanian permanent arbitration institutions – the Arbitration Court at the Association International Chamber of Commerce Lithuania and the Vilnius International Commercial Arbitration were merged into one institution, the Vilnius Court of Commercial Arbitration (VCCA).

Head
 Vitalija Baranovienė
 Prof. dr. Vytautas Nekrošius (until 2021)

References

External links 
Homepage (LT, EN, RU)

International arbitration courts and tribunals
Organizations based in Vilnius
Judiciary of Lithuania
2003 establishments in Lithuania
Courts and tribunals established in 2003